Nathan L. Good (born 1954) is an American architect best known for sustainable, green building designs. He was one of the first individuals that the U.S. Green Building Council designated as a LEED accredited professional. He is the founding principal of Nathan Good Architects PC, in Salem, Oregon, and a fellow of the American Institute of Architects.

Early life and education 
Nathan Good learned principles of green building in childhood. He has said,"I worked for 10 summers on the family farm in Oklahoma... I learned that you don't eat your seed corn, you salvage everything to be re-used some other time and you repair all of your equipment. I have a city boy in me who loves architecture and a farmer in me who understands self-sufficiency and resiliency."

He attended the University of Copenhagen's Denmark International Studies in Architecture in 1976–1977, prior to earning a Bachelor of Science Degree (1978) and a Master's Degree in Architecture (1991), both from California Polytechnic State University, San Luis Obispo.

Good is married to April Waters. They have a son, Aaron.

Career 

Good is best known for his sustainable, green building designs that strive for a net-zero, carbon neutral footprint as well as his eco-charrette design process. For an "environmentally sensitive design", he has conducted a design charrette, teaching sessions with clients, contractors, subcontractors and suppliers, to explain his principles and standards of green building design, and to answer their questions and concerns. 

Good designed the first fully FSC certified US single-family home. He was also the fifth individual in the United States to be designated a LEED accredited professional by the U.S. Green Building Council. He is an NCARB registered architect, and an NCIDQ certified interior designer. 

Good established Nathan Good Architects PC in 2005.

Selected honors and awards 
In 2015, Good was named a member of the College of Fellows of American Institute of Architects, in the category, "Advanced the science and art of planning and building by advancing the standards of architectural education, training and practice".

Naming Good their first "sustainability superhero" in 2019, Green Builder's Alan Naditz wrote of Good's ability to bring "sustainability to life, and making it part of every conversation. His portfolio of projects offers stunning examples of how environmental empathy and a responsible work can coexist."

Good and his firm have received regional, national and international design awards:

 2006: Sunset magazine's "Western Home Awards"
 2008: The Root Award: Home of the Year 2008 - Portland Spaces Magazine
 2012: 25 Green Building Leaders in the Northwest - Sustainable Industries Journal
 2012: Custom Green Home of the Year - National Association of Home Builders
 2012: Green Home of the Year, Best Eco-Integration - GreenBuilder Magazine
 2014: People's Choice Award - International Interior Design Association
 2015: Green Service of the Year - Mid-Willamette Valley Green Awards
 2015: Western Home Award - Sunset magazine
 2016: Best Vineyard & Tasting Room Experience - Sunset Magazine Travel Awards
 2017: Sustainable Design Award, 1st Place Residential Build Project - World Architecture's "Rethinking the Future"
 2018: Architectural Design Winner (homes over 3,000 sq.ft.) - Oregon Home Magazine Structure + Style Awards
 2018: DeMuro Award - Restore Oregon: Celebrating Preservation, Reuse, and Community Revitalization
 2018: Luxury Custom Home of the Year - GreenBuilder Magazine
 2019: Green Good Design Award - The Chicago Athenaeum Museum of Architecture and Design
 2019: LEED for Homes Project Team Green Home Builder of the Year - Earth Advantage

References

External links 

 Nathan Good Architects 
 "Zero Energy, Infinite Appeal"
 "Learning from a Library"

1954 births
Living people
20th-century American architects
21st-century American architects
Solar building designers
Sustainable building in the United States
Sustainability advocates